Hamlin Park is an 80-acre public park in Shoreline, Washington. The park includes a wooded area with trails, a softball/baseball field with bleachers, two playgrounds, and a picnic shelter. An orienteering course with waypoint markers is laid out within the park.

In 2017, the park was a subject of controversy in response to the city's proposal to convert part of the wooded area into a maintenance facility. After a series of "Save Hamlin Park" protests from city residents, the proposal was withdrawn.

References

External links
 Hamlin Park - Washington Trails Association

Parks in Shoreline, Washington